Thomas Truxtun Hare (October 12, 1878 – February 2, 1956) was an American Olympic medalist who competed in track and field and the hammer throw. He also played football with the University of Pennsylvania and was selected first-team All-American all four years. Sports Illustrated wrote, "Few early 20th Century players were as revered as Hare, who played every minute of every game." He was selected as a charter member of the College Football Hall of Fame in 1951.

Early life 
Hare was born in Philadelphia, Pennsylvania. He was the son of Emily Power (nee Beale) and Horace Binney Hare, a successful attorney. He came from a long line of lawyers. He attended St. Mark’s School in Southborough, Massachusetts where he graduated in 1897. There, he started in baseball, football, and track.

In the fall of 1897, He enrolled in the University of Pennsylvania where he received a B.S. in 1901. There, he was a member of the Fraternity of Delta Psi (St. Anthony Hall), the Ancient and Honorable Order of the Sons of Rest, and the Sphinx Senior Society. He performed in plays with Mask and Wig, was vice president of the Cercle Francais and an assistant manager of the Musical Clubs. He was freshman class president and was elected as the Spoon Man his senior year. 

At the University of Pennsylvania, Hare played on the varsity cricket team and the varsity track team, competing in jumper, runner, and weight thrower. The track team won their collegiate championships during his time. He also played on the Penn Quakers football team from 1897 to 1900 and served as team captain in his junior and senior years. He also played "every minute of every game for four years," helping his team win 32 consecutive games. He is one of only a handful of men to earn first-team All-American honors during all four years of college. While primarily a guard, he also called signals, kicked off, punted, ran, and drop-kicked extra points. Walter Camp said he could have been an All-American in any position.

He then enrolled in the University of Pennsylvania Law School, graduating with a law degree in 1903.

Olympics
He won the silver medal in the hammer throw in the 1900 Summer Olympics held in Paris, as well as placing eighth in the shot put and competing without making a legal mark in the discus throw. 

He competed for the United States in the 1904 Summer Olympics held in St. Louis, Missouri in the all-rounder which consisted of ten events: 100 yd run, shot put, high jump, 880 yd walk, hammer throw, pole vault, 120 yd hurdles, 56 lb weight throw, long jump, and 1-mile run, where he won the bronze medal.

Career 
After graduating from law school, he practiced corporate law in Philadelphia. In 1913, he became an assistant solicitor for the United Gas Improvement Company, retaining this position until 1943. 

He became the managing director and board member of Bryn Mawr Hospital in 1943. He replaced his brother, C. Willing Hare, who had died on December 6, 1942. In 1946, he was named president of the hospital. In this capacity, he oversaw the addition of a six-story wing, a $2.8 million project.

Hare also served as a director of the Philadelphia Contributionship for the Insurance Houses from Loss.

Starting in 1908, he authored two series of books for boys. His first series followed a  journey from college football to coaching. The second series, followed the same character through prep school. He also published poetry books.

Publications

Philip Kent, The College Athlete series 

 Making the Freshman Team. Philadelphia: The Penn Publishing Company, 1908.
 A Sophomore Half-Back. Philadelphia: The Penn Publishing Company, 1908.
 A Junior in the Line. Philadelphia: The Penn Publishing Company, 1909.
 A Senior Quarterback. Philadelphia: The Penn Publishing Company, 1910.
 A Graduate Coach. Philadelphia: The Penn Publishing Company, 1911.

Philip Kent of Malvern series 

 Philip Kent. Philadelphia: The Penn Publishing Company, 1914.
 Philip Kent in the Lower School. Philadelphia: The Penn Publishing Company, 1916.
 Philip Kent in the Upper School. Philadelphia: The Penn Publishing Company, 1918.
 Kent of Malvern. Philadelphia: The Penn Publishing Company, 1919.

Awards and honors 

 He was selected as a charter member of the College Football Hall of Fame in 1951 and was inducted in 1953.
 In an attempt to name retroactive Heisman Trophy winners before the first one was awarded in 1935, Hare was awarded the mythical 1900 trophy.
 He was named to the Helms Athletic Foundation’s College Football Hall of Fame.
 The Helms Athletic Foundation named Hare the player of the year for 1900.

Personal life 
He married Katherine Sargent Smith, a Philadelphia socialite, in 1906. They had four children: Truxtun Jr., Tristan, Robert, Martha and Mrs. Frederic McLaughlin. They lived in Radnor, Pennsylvania on a sixty-acre farm known as Limehouse. 

During the 1930s, Hare chaired the University of Pennsylvania Athletic Advisory Board. He was also a member of the University of Pennsylvania Scholarship Committee. He was a vestryman and senior warden at St. Martin’s Episcopal Church in Radnor.  

He was president of the United Bowmen of America and a member of the Merian Cricket Club, the Philadelphia Club, the Racquet Club of Philadelphia, the St. Anthony Club of Philadelphia, and the University Barge Club. He was also a member of the Authors’ League of America and the Pegasus Club. He was the founding president of the Business Men's Art Club in 1927, and his paintings and pottery was shown in exhibitions with the Art Club of Philadelphia. 

In 1956, he died at his home on Weadley Road in Radnor at the age of 77 years.

References

External links 

1878 births
1956 deaths
19th-century players of American football
All-American college football players
American male decathletes
American football guards
American male hammer throwers
Athletes (track and field) at the 1900 Summer Olympics
Athletes (track and field) at the 1904 Summer Olympics
College Football Hall of Fame inductees
Members of the Philadelphia Club
Olympic silver medalists for the United States in track and field
Olympic bronze medalists for the United States in track and field
Players of American football from Philadelphia
Track and field athletes from Philadelphia
University of Pennsylvania alumni
American lawyers
American football drop kickers
Medalists at the 1904 Summer Olympics
Medalists at the 1900 Summer Olympics
St. Anthony Hall
St. Mark's School (Massachusetts) alumni
Penn Quakers football players
Writers from Philadelphia
Lawyers from Philadelphia
People from Radnor Township, Pennsylvania
University of Pennsylvania Law School alumni